Humbergrove Secondary School (also called Humbergrove SS, HSS, Humbergrove, colloquially Humbergrove Collegiate Institute), originally known as Humbergrove Vocational School is a Toronto District School Board facility that operated as a public high school operated by the Etobicoke Board of Education from 1965 to 1988. As of 2019, the building remains under TDSB ownership.

See also
List of high schools in Ontario
Marian Academy
Father Henry Carr Catholic Secondary School

References

External links
Humbergrove Secondary School

High schools in Toronto
Education in Etobicoke
Educational institutions established in 1966
Educational institutions disestablished in 1988
Schools in the TDSB
Toronto Lands Corporation
1966 establishments in Ontario
1988 disestablishments in Ontario